André Routis (July 16, 1900 – July 16, 1969) was a French professional boxer. He fought 86 times between 1919 and 1929; winning 54 (12 by knockout), losing 25 and drawing 7. After a victory over Tony Canzoneri he held the World Featherweight title from 1928 to 1929. Earlier in his career Routis competed as a bantamweight, where he won the French title and fought three times for the EBU title. Before turning professional Routis won the French amateur bantamweight championship in 1918.

Professional career
Routis made his professional debut in February 1919 aged eighteen, when he beat Yves Gram by a four-round points decision. Like the majority of his early fights, the contest took place in his hometown of Bordeaux. He fought three times in April of the same year; a victory over Georges Gloria was followed by a draw with Bobby Diamond and his first loss, a ten-round decision against Emile Juliard in Paris. Following this defeat Routis returned to fighting in Bordeaux, remaining undefeated (including two draws) over his next seven bouts. In February 1921 he fought outside France for the first time when he faced Ali Ben Said in Casablanca, Morocco, he won the fight by disqualification. Over the next fourteen months Routis fought eleven times in Morocco, losing twice, including an unsuccessful challenge for Charles Ledoux's EBU bantamweight title. The two boxers fought a rematch in May 1923, for the EBU and French title, with the result the same as the first fight, a fifteen-round decision win for Ledoux. Routis won his first title in January 1924 when he faced Ledoux for a third time. The fight, which Routis won with a twenty-round points victory, was for the French bantamweight title. He remained undefeated for the remainder of 1924 before losing to Johnny Brown in London, and failing in a third attempt at the EBU title, losing a twenty-round decision to Henri Scillie in Brussels. In October Routis lost his French title to Kid Francis in Paris. In 1926 he lost twice to the future world champion Jack Kid Berg, both bouts took place in Berg's hometown of London.

From August 1926 to August 1927 Routis fought exclusively in the United States (9 wins, 5 losses and 1 draw). Now competing as a featherweight, Routis made his American debut against Eddie Anderson at Ebbets Field in Brooklyn. Routis won the fight with a twelve-round points decision, he beat Anderson twice more during his year in the United States. Included in his 5 losses was a defeat to the future world champion Tony Canzoneri, who beat Routis on points, and a pair of losses to Joe Glick. After his return to France Routis fought another future world champion, Panama Al Brown, this time winning over ten rounds. After a draw against Johnny Cuthbert in Paris, he returned to the United States and won five fights in a row, which led to his first attempt at a world title.

Featherweight world champion
In September 1928 Routis challenged Canzoneri for the world featherweight title, the NYSAC and NBA titles were also on the line. The fight took place in front of 10,000 spectators at New York City's Madison Square Garden. The contest started badly for Routis as he was knocked down by a right hook in the first two minutes of the opening round. Routis had to survive a barrage of punches from the champion for the remainder of the round but managed to stay on his feet. Canzoneri continued to outbox Routis over the first half of the fight, resulting in a large lead on the scorecards. The second half of the fight, however, belonged to the challenger, who frequently connected with punches to the head and body that hurt Canzoneri. After fifteen rounds the fight was awarded to Routis via a split decision. Following this victory Routis lost two 10 round non-title fights to Dick Finnegan and Canzoneri. The first defence of his title came in May 1929 when he fought Buster Brown in Baltimore. After winning the first two rounds Brown was knocked down three times in the 3rd, causing the corner to throw in the towel, giving Routis a technical knockout victory. Following the bout Police had to surround the ring to prevent a riot after the crowd took exception to the actions of Brown's corner.

From June to August 1929 Routis lost four fights in a row, all non-title bouts. This was followed, in September, by the 2nd defence of his title, against Battling Battalino in East Hartford. Routis, who was considered to be past his best, was unable to prevent Battalino from dominating the fifteen rounds to become the new champion. Routis fought for a final time in November 1929, losing a 10-round newspaper decision to Davey Abad in St. Louis.

Personal life
A veteran of the French Colonial Army, Routis spent two years based in Morocco as a mechanic in the air corps. In July 1969, on the day of his 69th birthday, Routis suffered a heart attack which led to his death.

Professional boxing record
All information in this section is derived from BoxRec, unless otherwise stated.

Official record

All newspaper decisions are officially regarded as “no decision” bouts and are not counted in the win/loss/draw column.

Unofficial record

Record with the inclusion of newspaper decisions in the win/loss/draw column.

See also
Lineal championship

References

External links

|-

  

1900 births
1969 deaths
Sportspeople from Bordeaux
Featherweight boxers
Bantamweight boxers
World featherweight boxing champions
French male boxers
20th-century French military personnel